Randi Vestergaard Evaldsen (born 13 April 1984) is a Greenlandic politician, and a member of the Inatsisartut. She was the former Chairman of the Democrats and was formerly a Ministry of Finance (Denmark).

References 

1978 births
Living people
Women members of the Parliament of Greenland
Members of the Parliament of Greenland
People from Nuuk